Grand Ridge is located in Northwest Florida (The Panhandle), 45 minutes west of Tallahassee and 40 minutes southeast of Dothan, Alabama.

Grand Ridge High School functioned as an all grades school from its founding in 1887 until the end of the 2005–2006 school year, when it was consolidated with neighboring Sneads High School, becoming a Pre-K through 8th grade Public Unit School with an enrollment of 600 students. It is part of the Jackson County in School Board System, and is under the supervision of Laura Kent, Principal. AssistantPrincipals are Travis Blanton and Amber Tucker.

References 

Jackson County Floridan "Indians joining Pirates in school-pairing worked well" ANNE SPENCER 19 May 2007

External links
 

High schools in Jackson County, Florida
Public high schools in Florida
Educational institutions established in 1887
1887 establishments in Florida